Charles Lewis is an investigative journalist based in Washington D.C. He founded The Center for Public Integrity and several other nonprofit organizations and is currently the executive editor of the Investigative Reporting Workshop at the American University School of Communication in D.C. 

He was previously an investigative producer for ABC News and the CBS news program 60 Minutes. He left 60 Minutes in 1989 and founded the Center for Public Integrity (CPI), a nonprofit news organization. In 1997, he led the creation of the International Consortium of Investigative Journalists, which focuses on cross-border crime and corruption. CPI was awarded a Pulitzer Prize in 2014 for investigative reporting, with ICIJ winning 2017 in the category of explanatory reporting for the “Panama Papers” scandal.

As a bestselling author, Lewis has been called "a watchdog in the corridors of power" by the National Journal and "the godfather of nonprofit investigative journalism." 

The Wall Street Journal said that "with the founding of the Center for Public Integrity in the 1980s... probably did more than anyone else to launch institutional nonprofit journalism in America."

He was a Ferris Professor at Princeton University in 2005, a Shorenstein Fellow at Harvard University in the spring of 2006, and is currently a tenured professor of journalism at American University in Washington, D.C. He is the author of the 2014 book is 935 Lies: The Future of Truth and the Decline of America’s Moral Integrity In 2018, he was awarded the I.F. Stone Medal for Journalistic Independence by Harvard's Nieman Foundation.

Early life and education 
Charles Reed Esray Lewis III grew up in a middle-class family in Newark, Delaware, where he attended public schools and graduated from Newark High School in 1971. As a senior, he was elected president of the school’s student government association, and he also wrote for the student newspaper, the Yellowjacket Buzz. It was around this time he became an Eagle Scout.

Lewis majored in political science at the University of Delaware. He worked weeknights in the sports department of the Wilmington News Journal newspapers, writing stories and a weekly column. In the spring of 1974, he served as a paid intern in the Washington office of Senator William Roth (R-DE). He graduated with honors and distinction in 1975. In June 1977, he received a master’s degree from the Johns Hopkins University School of Advanced International Studies, in Washington, D.C.

Lewis is married to Pamela Gilbert, a consumer-protection lawyer and former executive director of the U.S. Consumer Product Safety Commission. They live in the Washington, D.C., area. He is the father of two children, Cassandra Lewis Slattery, an award-winning playwright and author, and Gabriel Gilbert Lewis, a college film student.

Career 
In October 1977, ABC News Vice President Sander Vanocur hired Lewis to be a reportorial producer (off-air reporter) in the newly created Special Reporting Unit, based in Washington, D.C. He provided research, reporting, and production assistance for all of the ABC News national programs. Stories he worked on included attempted presidential assassinations, prospective Supreme Court nominees, FBI misconduct, and Washington corruption scandals such as ABSCAM. He also worked on investigating civil rights murders in Alabama during the 1960s, culminating in a two-part 20/20 television news exposé, narrated by Vanocur.

CBS 60 Minutes 
In early 1984, CBS News, in New York, hired Lewis as an associate producer for its news magazine program 60 Minutes. He was assigned to work with senior correspondent Mike Wallace, and was promoted to full producer. Over the next nearly five years, Lewis associate produced two investigative segments with Wallace and produced eight investigative segments, two of which received Emmy nominations. Many of the reports generated legal threats against the program and CBS News. 

During the preparation of his last story, "Foreign Agent," both Wallace and 60 Minutes executive producer Don Hewitt forced Lewis to remove from his script the name of former Commerce Secretary Peter G. Peterson, a close personal friend of Hewitt's. Lewis deeply resented the internal censorship and quit 60 Minutes  "in the midst of a four-year contract, with a family to support, a mortgage to pay, and virtually no savings."

Center for Public Integrity 

In October 1989, from his home in the Washington D.C. area, Lewis founded the Center for Public Integrity whose novel mission was to pursue investigative reporting based on intensive, long-term projects involving teams of researchers and extensive documents. Within a few months, the Center was incorporated as a tax-exempt nonprofit with Lewis on the board of directors along with journalists Alejandro Benes and Charles Piller.

From 1989 to 2004, under Lewis' tenure as executive director, the Center for Public Integrity published roughly 275 investigative reports and 14 books. Three of them, co-authored by Lewis and published by HarperCollins, were finalists for book-of-the-year honors by Investigative Reporters and Editors:

 The Buying of the President (1996)
 The Buying of the Congress (1998)
 The Buying of the President 2000

The Buying of the President 2004, Lewis' fifth and last co-authored book with the Center, was a New York Times bestseller.

CPI under Lewis’ leadership was honored 35 times by national journalism organizations and associations. In 2004, “Windfalls of War” won the first online George Polk Award. In 2005, CPI won the Edward R. Murrow Award for best website, small market category, in the United States.

Media appearances
Lewis has been interviewed in numerous major newspapers and he has appeared on NBC’s The Today Show and Nightly News; ABC's World News Tonight, Good Morning America, 20/20 and Nightline; CBS' 60 Minutes, Evening News and Morning News; CNN; C-SPAN; The Daily Show; and numerous other TV and radio programs.

Awards
Lewis was awarded a MacArthur Fellowship in 1998. In 2004, PEN USA, a literary organization, awarded its First Amendment Award to him,"for expanding the reach of investigative journalism, for his courage in going after a story regardless of whose toes he steps on, and for boldly exercising his freedom of speech and freedom of the press." 

In 2018, Lewis was awarded the I.F. Stone Medal for Journalistic Independence by the Harvard University Nieman Foundation for Journalism “in recognition of his unceasing efforts to strengthen and support the work of investigative journalists in the U.S. and abroad.”

In 2009, The Encyclopedia of Journalism cited Lewis as "one of the 30 most notable investigative reporters in the U.S. since World War I." That same year, he was given an honorary degree by his alma mater the University of Delaware. In 2013, the University of Missouri awarded him its Honor Medal for Distinguished Service in Journalism.

References

External links

Charles Lewis homepage
Charles Lewis, Founder Bio at The Center for Public Integrity
Charles Lewis Bio at Investigative Reporting Workshop
Official Website of Lewis' 2014 Book, 935 Lies: The Future Of Truth and the Decline of America's Moral Integrity

Living people
1953 births
MacArthur Fellows
American investigative journalists
60 Minutes producers